is an airport in Okayama Prefecture, Japan. It is also known as Okayama Momotaro Airport.

It is about 10 minutes from the Okayama interchange, Sanyo Expressway.

History
The airport opened in March 1988 as a replacement for the former Okayama Airport located on the waterfront in Minami-ku, Okayama. Its runway, originally 2,000 m in length, was extended to 2,500 m in 1993 and to 3,000 m in 2001.

Airlines and destinations

Statistics

Transportation
Bus service to the airport from Okayama Station is provided by Okaden Bus and Chūtetsu Bus. Bus service to Kurashiki Station is provided by Chūtetsu Bus and Shimoden Bus. Bus times are coordinated with the flight times. Although the scheduled times are relatively close to the departure and arrivals times of flights, this is because the airport is small and it takes relatively little time to proceed through the airport.

See also

List of airports in Japan

References

External links
 Okayama Airport 

Airports in Japan
Transport in Okayama Prefecture
Buildings and structures in Okayama Prefecture
Airports established in 1988
1988 establishments in Japan
Okayama